Glomeris klugii is a species of pill millipedes.

Description

It can be yellow mottled or marbled, brown or sometimes red. This species in Europe shows two colour morphs, the dark “undulata” and the light “conspersa”, the most widespread.

Distribution
These pill millipedes can be found in Europe and North Africa.

References

 Golovatch, Sergei Ilyich; Hoffman, Richard Lawrence (2000) On the diplopod taxa and type material of J. F. Brandt, with some new descriptions and identities (Diplopoda), Fragmenta faunistica, Supplement, 43: 229-249: 229-249.
 SysMyr: Systematic Myriapod Database. Spelda J.,

Glomerida
Millipedes of Europe
Millipedes of Africa